The 1983 Auckland City mayoral election was part of the New Zealand local elections held that same year. In 1983, elections were held for the Mayor of Auckland plus other local government positions including twenty-one city councillors. The polling was conducted using the standard first-past-the-post electoral method.

Background
Incumbent Mayor Colin Kay was defeated by Labour Party candidate Catherine Tizard who became Auckland's first female Mayor and first from the Labour Party, while the council saw a landslide result to the Citizens & Ratepayers ticket who picked up all but one council seat.

It also marked the last time in Auckland where local body elections elected councillors at large.

Mayoralty results

Councillor results

 
 
 
 
 
 
 
 
 
 
 
 
 
 
 
 
 
 
 
 
 
 
 
 
 
 
 
 
 
 
 
 
 
 
 
 
 
 
 
 
 
 
 
 
 
 
 
 
 
 
 
 
 
 
 
 
 
 
 

Table footnotes:

References

Mayoral elections in Auckland
1983 elections in New Zealand
Politics of the Auckland Region
1980s in Auckland
October 1983 events in New Zealand